The 2001 OFC U-20 Championship was the thirteenth contested. It was won by Australia who qualified for the 2001 FIFA U-20 World Cup after defeating New Zealand 4–3 on aggregate.

Participating teams

Matches

Group stage

Group A

 withdrew

New Zealand advanced to the play-off.

Group B

Australia advanced to the play-off.

Samoa withdrew

Play-off

Australia qualified for the 2001 FIFA World Youth Championship

See also
2001 FIFA World Youth Championship

External links
 RSSSF Match Results and Squads

OFC U-20 Championship
Under 20
International association football competitions hosted by New Caledonia
2001 in New Caledonian sport
2001 in Cook Islands sport
International sports competitions hosted by the Cook Islands
2001 in youth association football